Ishpingo is a common name for several South American plants. The name is derived from the Quechua word ispinku which may be Hispanicized as ishpingo or eshpingo.

Ishpingo may refer to:

Amburana cearensis, used to produce timber
Nectandra, several species used medicinally
Ocotea quixos, used as a spice